The Land Rover Discovery Sport (internal code L550) is a compact luxury crossover SUV produced by British automotive company Jaguar Land Rover since 2014, under their Land Rover marque, and since 2017 their best-selling model.

Introduced in late 2014, it replaces the Freelander in a revised Land Rover range of vehicles, with Discovery joining Range Rover as a sub-brand. Contrary to its predecessor, the slightly larger car is also available in a seven seat layout.

The first generation Discovery Sport is based on the JLR D8/LR-MS platform, customised for off-road applications, and is powered by a range of four cylinder petrol and diesel engines. It is the first Discovery introduced with a unibody structure.

The second generation model is based on the modified version of the JLR D8/LR-MS platform, that's JLR PTA platform, as used by the Jaguar E-Pace and L551 version of Range Rover Evoque.


Overview

Conception

The Discovery Sport represents the third generation of compact SUV produced by Land Rover and replaced the Freelander. Although the Freelander model range had been a successful way to enable Land Rover to move into the medium SUV market, the company felt that the Freelander brand was tainted with memories of unreliability, and that the Discovery brand was more prestigious. 

The future design direction of the Discovery sub-brand was initially previewed in the form of the Land Rover Discovery Vision concept, shown at the 2014 New York International Auto Show, and it was during the show that Gerry McGovern announced the Land Rover Discovery Sport would be the first new model in the enlarged Discovery family. The sub-brand was to be used in the same way as Range Rover, but on leisure and family orientated models, with Range Rover models focusing on the luxury market segment. The new Discovery sub-brand was to feature two models initially, the compact Discovery Sport and the larger Discovery (sold as the LR4 in North America).

Exterior 

The Discovery Sport was styled by Gerry McGovern, who was responsible for the design of the original Freelander model. The Discovery Sport shares several design cues with the larger Discovery Vision concept, though the concept vehicle is closer in size to the Discovery 4 model. McGovern left Land Rover for Ford in 1999, before returning as Director of Advanced Design in 2004. He was promoted to Design Director when Geoff Upex retired in 2006, and has been responsible for design of all three current Range Rover models. His predecessor, Upex, was responsible for the Freelander 2 design.

The Discovery Sport features a steel monocoque, the bonnet, wings, roof and tailgate are made from aluminium and a panoramic glass sunroof is available either as standard or as an optional extra depending on model variant. A powered tailgate can also be specified as an option, featuring remote control operation.

In certain markets, the bonnet is fitted with an airbag to improve pedestrian survivability in the event of a collision. The airbag is mounted in a panel at the trailing edge of the bonnet panel and protects a pedestrian's head from striking the base of the windscreen.

Chassis 
The Discovery Sport is the first to feature unibody construction — the larger, full size Discovery models were traditional body-on-frame SUVs, until the Discovery 5 followed suit in 2017. The platform used for the Discovery Sport is the Land Rover LR-MS platform, shared with the Range Rover Evoque and derived from the Ford EUCD platform, but with 90% of components redesigned from scratch to meet Land Rover's specific demands, primarily related to off-road use.

The Discovery Sport includes further changes to the platform in comparison with the Evoque, with a new compact rear multi-link suspension design to permit the folding rear seats and spare wheel well in the boot space, without requiring an unduly high and impractical load floor. The front suspension is a MacPherson strut design carried over from the Range Rover Evoque largely unchanged, and features steel lower and aluminium upper control arms.

The approach angle for the Discovery Sport is 25° and the ramp angle is 21°, reductions of 6° and 2° respectively, when compared to the Freelander 2. The departure angle remains unchanged at 31°. The Discovery Sport features removable components on the lower sections of the front bumper which improves the approach angle.

The braking system also features an emergency brake force assistance system to reduce stopping distances in an emergency, stability aides, and an autonomous emergency braking system. The Discovery Sport, when tested by Euro NCAP in December 2014, was awarded a five star safety rating, and based on its score, was ranked as the safest vehicle in its class, the Small Off-Road class.

The electric power steering system allows the Discovery Sport to feature an automatic parking system.

Various emergency spare wheels options are available depending on vehicle configuration: a full-size spare wheel mounted internally under the floor of the load area, or if the 5+2 seating option is fitted it a 'space-saver' spare wheel mounted on the underside of the car was to be used. It was not possible to have a factory-fitted tow bar with a spare wheel on 5+2 seat vehicles as they mount in the same place under the vehicle, so a tyre repair system of sealant and a compressor was supplied instead.

Engines 

The engines sourced from Ford were replaced by engines from Jaguar Land Rover's new Ingenium engine line from late 2015. The Ingenium family is a range of modular four cylinder turbocharged engines of 2.0-litre capacity, built around individual 500cc cylinders. The family is produced in both petrol and diesel variants, and could also be produced in 3, 4 and 6 cylinder options in future, depending on demand and requirements. The range was designed from the outset to accommodate different hybrid power systems, and it was expected that there would be a plug-in hybrid variant.

The Ingenium engine range can be configured to deliver different power outputs, and the most fuel efficient Discovery Sport eD4 model is powered by a  2.0-litre four cylinder turbocharged diesel engine in a front wheel drive only configuration.

The engines in the Discovery Sport are mounted transversely, which creates additional interior space.

Transmission 

The Discovery Sport is manufactured with either a 9–speed ZF 9-HP automatic gearbox or a 6–speed Getrag M66EH50 manual gearbox, both of which are also available on the Range Rover Evoque.

Two different all-wheel drive systems are available. The standard system is the Haldex Traction fifth generation system. Optional is the new Land Rover Active Driveline system, which is manufactured by GKN Driveline and which has a 75% smaller parasitic load when compared to the Haldex system. This delivers increased fuel economy and reduced CO2 emissions. The Active Driveline system works by disconnecting all of the major all wheel drive components from the gearbox, rather than at the central coupling. The system also features torque vectoring to direct power to individual wheels.

Neither system has a low range transfer box, although the ZF 9-HP features a special very low ratio first gear which is used only when the vehicle is off-road or otherwise needed. For on-road use, the vehicle will normally start in second gear.

The Discovery Sport was to be also available in a two-wheel drive version, in which only the front wheels are driven. The Terrain Response System, which configures the vehicle for off-road use, is deleted. This version was to be the most fuel efficient and least polluting model in the range, and together with the more fuel efficient Jaguar XE models, was to assist Jaguar Land Rover in meeting European Union emissions directives.

Interior 

The interior of the Discovery Sport is available in a seven-seat (referred to as five plus two) configuration, with the front row featuring two seats and three seats on the second row. The second row seats slide and recline, and fold in a 60:40 configuration, folding forward to allow access to a third row of two seats where fitted. The third row of seats are not intended for full-time usage, and are described by Land Rover as being suitable for children up to the age of 15 and occasional adult use. They fold flat into the floor of the trunk when not in use. Isofix mounting points for child safety seats are fitted as standard.

The central console features an  touch screen allowing access to in car entertainment, satellite navigation and vehicle settings. The system, shared with the Jaguar XE, allows smartphone connectivity and some models allows the owner to control the vehicle remotely, pre-heating the interior or unlocking the car using a smartphone application.

Production 
The Discovery Sport is manufactured at the Jaguar Land Rover Halewood assembly facility, in Halewood, Liverpool, United Kingdom, alongside the Range Rover Evoque.

Early model engines were supplied by Ford manufactured at two sites - the Duratorq diesel engine at the Ford Dagenham plant in the United Kingdom and the Ecoboost petrol engine at the Ford Valencia Plant in Spain. The Jaguar Land Rover Ingenium engines, which have replaced the Ford sourced engines in late 2015, are manufactured at Jaguar Land Rover's Engine Manufacturing Centre in Wolverhampton, United Kingdom.

Transmissions for the Discovery Sport are manufactured by ZF at their Gray Court, South Carolina facility, and by Getrag Ford Transmissions at their Cologne, Germany plant. Four wheel drive components are manufactured by Haldex in Landskrona, Sweden or by GKN in Köping, Sweden and Birmingham, United Kingdom.

Facelift 

In 2019, the Discovery Sport facelift is based on an all-new Jaguar Land Rover Premium Transverse Architecture (PTA) platform shared with the Jaguar E-Pace and the second generation of Range Rover Evoque.

Worldwide sales 

In 2017 it became the best selling Land Rover model.

References

External links

 Land Rover UK Discovery Sport
 Land Rover USA Discovery Sport
 Land Rover Australia Discovery Sport
 Land Rover MENA Discovery Sport

Discovery Sport
Cars introduced in 2014
2020s cars
Compact sport utility vehicles
Luxury crossover sport utility vehicles
Front-wheel-drive vehicles
All-wheel-drive vehicles
Euro NCAP small off-road
Euro NCAP large off-road